Minnie is a feminine given name and a nickname for both men and women.

Minnie may also refer to:


Places
 Minnie, Kentucky, an unincorporated community
 Minnie, West Virginia, an unincorporated community
 Minnie Township, Beltrami County, Minnesota
 Minnie Island (disambiguation)
 A shortened form of the US state of Minnesota and/or the city of Minneapolis

Arts and entertainment
 Minnie (album), by Minnie Riperton
 Minnie (film), a 1923 silent film starring Leatrice Joy and directed by Marshall Neilan
 Minnie Mouse, an American fictional cartoon character created by The Walt Disney Company

People
 Derick Minnie (born 1986), South African rugby union player
 Minnie Driver (born 1970), English actress
 Minnie Miñoso (1923–2015), Cuban baseball player
 Minnie Pearl (1912-1996), stage name of American country comedian Sarah Colley
 Minnie Riperton (1947–1979), American singer-songwriter
 Minnie Gow Walsworth (1859-1947), American poet
 Memphis Minnie (1897-1973), American blues guitarist, vocalist and songwriter
 Minnie (singer) (born 1997), Thai singer Minnie Nicha Yontararak of K-pop group (G)I-dle

Other uses
 Minenwerfer, a World War I weapon nicknamed "Minnie"

See also
 Mini (disambiguation)
 Minié (disambiguation)
 Minny (disambiguation)